Judge Boreman may refer to:

Arthur I. Boreman (1823–1896), judge of the Wood County, Virginia, Circuit Court
Herbert Stephenson Boreman (1897–1982), judge of the United States Court of Appeals for the Fourth Circuit
Jacob S. Boreman (1831–1913), judge of the Common Pleas Court of Jackson County, Missouribefore becoming a justice of the Supreme Court of the Utah Territory
Paul D. Borman (born 1939), judge of the United States District Court for the Eastern District of Michigan